This is a list of films produced by the Tollywood (Telugu language film industry) based in Hyderabad in the year 1989.

1989 films

Released films 

1989
Telugu
Telugu films